Floriography is the debut studio album released by Norwegian musician Moddi. The album was released on 8 February 2010 through Propeller Recordings in Norway. The album peaked at number nine on the Norwegian Albums Charts. The album includes the single "Ardennes" and "Smoke".

Singles
A Kontaktor remix of "Ardennes" was released as the lead single from the album 21 February 2011. "Smoke" was released as the second single from the album 12 December 2011.

Track listing

Chart performance

Weekly charts

Release history

References

2010 albums
Moddi albums